Man on the Line is the seventh studio album by Chris de Burgh, released in 1984.

Release
It produced de Burgh's second UK hit single, "High on Emotion", which entered the chart on 12 May 1984 and peaked at number 44, the same position it reached on the US Billboard Hot 100. The album reached number 11 on the UK Albums Chart and remained on the chart for 24 weeks. 
In Germany and Switzerland, the album hit number one on the weekly charts and was the second-best-selling album of 1984 in both countries.

Track listing
All songs by Chris de Burgh.

Personnel

Musicians
 Chris de Burgh – acoustic guitars, lead and backing vocals
 Phil Palmer – electric guitars
 John Giblin – bass guitar (3)
 Rupert Hine – keyboards, synthesizers, backing vocals, orchestral arrangements
 Howard Jones – piano (4)
 Trevor Morais – drums (5)
 Tina Turner – guest vocals (5)

Touring band members
 Glenn Morrow – keyboards, synthesizers
 Ian Kojima – synthesizers, guitars, saxophone
 Danny McBride – electric guitars
 Al Marnie – bass guitar, backing vocals
 Jeff Phillips – drums, percussion

Production
 Produced by Rupert Hine
 Engineering and mixing – Stephen W. Tayler
 Assistant engineer – Andrew Scarth
 Mastering – Frank DeLuna at A&M Mastering Studios (Los Angeles, California)
 Photography – Brian Griffin
 Art direction – Michael Ross
 Assistant art director – Dave Margereson
 Design – Simon Adamczewski and Jerry Williams

Charts

Weekly charts

Year-end charts

References

Chris de Burgh albums
1984 albums
Albums produced by Rupert Hine
A&M Records albums
Albums recorded at Henson Recording Studios